Puff: Wonders of the Reef is a 2021 Australian nature documentary film made for Netflix and directed by Nick Robinson. The story follows a baby pufferfish and offers a view of its coral reef's ecosystem from the perspective of the fish. It was released on December 16, 2021.

References

External links 

2021 films
2021 documentary films
Documentary films about fish
2020s English-language films